HMAS Wollongong (ACPB 92), named for the city of Wollongong, was an Armidale-class patrol boat of the Royal Australian Navy (RAN).

Design and construction

The semi-displacement vee hull is fabricated from aluminium alloy, and each vessel is built to a combination of Det Norske Veritas standards for high-speed light craft and RAN requirements.

The main armament of the Armidale class is a Rafael Typhoon stabilised  gun mount fitted with an M242 Bushmaster autocannon. Two  machine guns are also carried. Boarding operations are performed by two , waterjet propelled rigid-hulled inflatable boats (RHIBs), named Wolf and Hawk. Each RHIB is stored in a dedicated cradle and davit, and is capable of operating independently from the patrol boat as it carries its own communications, navigation, and safety equipment.

Each patrol boat has a standard ship's company of 21 personnel, with a maximum of 29. The Armidales do not have a permanently assigned ship's company; instead, they are assigned to divisions at a ratio of two vessels to three companies, which rotate through the vessels and allow the Armidales to spend more time at sea, without compromising sailors' rest time or training requirements. A 20-berth auxiliary accommodation compartment was included in the design for the transportation of soldiers, illegal fishermen, or unauthorised arrivals; in the latter two cases, the compartment could be secured from the outside. However, a malfunction in the sewerage treatment facilities aboard  in August 2006 pumped hydrogen sulphide and carbon monoxide into the compartment, non-fatally poisoning four sailors working inside, after which use of the compartment for accommodation was banned across the class.

Wollongong was constructed by Austal in Henderson, Western Australia. Wollongong was commissioned into the RAN at Fleet Base East in Sydney on 23 June 2007.

Operational history
Operationally, Wollongong has spent the majority of her career on border patrol to Australia's north and north-west. The ship is assigned to Ardent Division of the Australian Patrol Boat Group, is based in Cairns, and performs border protection and fisheries protection patrols.

In July 2007, the ship became the first vessel of her class to visit the port of Brisbane, Queensland.

Following a request from the Make-A-Wish Foundation, Wollongong was 'commanded' for a day in January 2008 by an 11-year-old.

In June 2012, Wollongong was one of several ships to respond to a Suspected Illegal Entry Vessel which sank with 206 passengers while en route to Australia. The patrol boat transported the 109 survivors found during the initial rescue operation to immigrant processing facilities at Christmas Island.

Citations

References
Books

 The chapter is available separately as Semaphore, Issue 4, 2006 in PDF and HTML formats.

Journal and news articles

Ships built by Austal
Naval ships of Australia
Armidale-class patrol boats
2007 ships